Never Done Nothing Like That Before was the first single from Supergrass's fourth album Life on Other Planets and was released in July 2002.

As a vinyl-only release with only 2500 pressings, the single only reached #75 in the UK Singles Chart. The single version is slightly longer than the album version as the end of the album's previous track (featuring fireworks being set off by Danny Goffey) is used as an introduction.

The website, Children of the Monkey Basket, explains the song in further detail - “First release of the century, and what a corker. We had the main riff for this kicking around for about five years, and ended up recording it third for the new album. Nice touches, include Dermot playing piano with a screwdriver, the Jackel on milk bottles, and Danny setting the studio alight with fireworks, as it was recorded on Guy Fawkes Night.”

Track listing
LTD. ED. 7" R6583
“Never Done Nothing Like That Before” – 2:00

References

2002 singles
Supergrass songs
Parlophone singles
2002 songs